Faruk Can Genç (born 16 February 2000) is a Turkish professional footballer who plays as a defender for Giresunspor.

Career
A youth product of Trabzonspor since the age of 13, Genç signed a professional contract with them in 2019. He made his professional debut for Trabzonspor in a 1-0 Süper Lig win over Başakşehir on 19 February 2021. On 7 September 2021 he joined Ümraniyespor on a season long loan. On 16 August 2022, he moved to Ankara Keçiörengücü on a season long loan.

His loan was cut short and on 9 September 2022, Genç signed with Giresunspor.

International career
Genç is a youth international for Turkiye, having played for the Turkey U18s in 2018.

References

External links
 
 

2000 births
Living people
Sportspeople from Trabzon
Turkish footballers
Turkey youth international footballers
Trabzonspor footballers
Ümraniyespor footballers
Ankara Keçiörengücü S.K. footballers
Giresunspor footballers
Süper Lig players
TFF First League players
Association football fullbacks